"There'll Be Sad Songs (To Make You Cry)" is a song by English singer Billy Ocean from his sixth studio album, Love Zone (1986). The song was written and produced by Wayne Brathwaite and Barry Eastmond; Ocean was also credited as a co-writer for the song. The song reached number one on the Billboard Hot 100 for the week beginning 5 July 1986, where it remained for one week, becoming the 600th song to ascend to that position. It also topped the adult contemporary and R&B charts in the United States that same summer.

Background
According to Barry Eastmond, the song was inspired by an incident involving Ocean's single of the previous year, "Suddenly". Eastmond told Fred Bronson in The Billboard Book of Number One Hits about a friend of his wife's who had recently broken up with a long-term boyfriend. While at a party thrown by her new boyfriend, the song "Suddenly", which reminded her of her previous boyfriend, was played, and she broke down in tears. Eastmond and his co-writers used this scenario as the basis for writing "There'll Be Sad Songs (To Make You Cry)".

Music video
Towards the end of the music video for "There'll Be Sad Songs (To Make You Cry)", Ocean stands seeing a woman coming towards him and as he gets ready to hug her, but she walks past him, to his devastation. An alternative video consists of Ocean performing the song live at one of his concerts in 1986.

Charts

Weekly charts

Year-end charts

References

1980s ballads
1986 singles
1986 songs
Billboard Hot 100 number-one singles
Billy Ocean songs
Cashbox number-one singles
Contemporary R&B ballads
Jive Records singles
RPM Top Singles number-one singles
Soul ballads
Songs about music
Songs written by Barry Eastmond
Songs written by Billy Ocean
Songs written by Wayne Brathwaite